The Baimiweng Fort, also known as Holland Castle or Gun Emplacement of Fort Holland, is a former fort in Zhongshan District, Keelung, Taiwan.

History
The fort was probably constructed during the Dutch Formosa and Spanish Formosa period. It was once occupied by the French Third Republic army during the Sino-French War. The Japanese government remodeled the fort to become as what it is today. In September 2016, the Keelung City Government announced a plan to restore and preserve the fort under the subsidy of the Ministry of Culture.

Architecture
The sea facing fort shape has a rectangle shape. It has three sections, which are Barbette, control center and observation station.

See also
 List of tourist attractions in Taiwan

References

Forts in Keelung